Majid Halvaei (born 7 February 1948) is a retired Iranian association football defender. Between 1970 and 1974 he played 15 international matches, at the 1970 Asian Games, 1972 Summer Olympics and 1972 AFC Asian Cup, which Iran won. Domestically he mostly stayed with PAS Tehran F.C.

He scored 2 international goals during his career. His first national goal was against Chile in Brazil Independence Cup. His second goal was against Brazil in 1972 Summer Olympics which was the only goal of the match and secured Iran's victory over Brazil.

References

1948 births
Living people
Iranian footballers
Iran international footballers
Olympic footballers of Iran
Association football defenders
Footballers at the 1972 Summer Olympics
1972 AFC Asian Cup players
People from Ahvaz
Sportspeople from Khuzestan province